John Heneage ( – 21 July 1557) was an English politician.

He was a Member (MP) of the Parliament of England for Great Grimsby in 1523 and 1529 and for Lincolnshire in 1539.

References

1485 births
1557 deaths
Members of the Parliament of England for Great Grimsby
English MPs 1523
English MPs 1529–1536
English MPs 1539–1540